The 1955 SANFL Grand Final was an Australian rules football championship game.   beat  101 to 38.

References 

SANFL Grand Finals
SANFL Grand Final, 1955